USS Dixie III (SP-701), later USS SP-701, was a United States Navy patrol vessel in commission from 1917 to 1919.

Dixie III was built in 1911 as a civilian motorboat of the same name by Bowes and Mower at Philadelphia, Pennsylvania. The State of Maine operated her as a pleasure craft until early May 1917, when the U.S. Navy acquired her for use as a section patrol vessel during World War I. She was commissioned as USS Dixie III (SP-701) in early May 1917.

Probably assigned to the 1st Naval District in northern New England, Dixie III served on patrol duty for the rest of World War I. In April 1918 she was renamed USS SP-701.

SP-701 was returned to the State of Maine in May 1919.

References
Department of the Navy Naval History and Heritage Command Online Library of Selected Images: U.S. Navy Ships: USS Dixie III (SP-701), 1917-1919. Renamed SP-701 in 1918
NavSource Online: Section Patrol Craft Photo Archive: SP-701 ex-Dixie III (SP 701)

Patrol vessels of the United States Navy
World War I patrol vessels of the United States
Ships built in Philadelphia
1911 ships